Roset may refer to:

Business
 Ligne Roset, a French modern furniture company

Places
 Roset-Fluans, a commune in the Doubs department, France
 Ogașu lui Roșeț, a tributary of the Cerna River in Romania
 Roset, Vestland, a village in Stryn municipality, Vestland county, Norway

See also
 Rosette (disambiguation)
 Rozet (disambiguation)